The Government Gazette is the official journal of the Government of Greece which lists all laws passed in a set time period ratified by Cabinet and President. It was first issued in 1833. Until 1835, during the regency on behalf of King Otto, the gazette was bilingual in Greek and German. No law in Greece is valid until is published in this journal. Foundations, duties and rights of juridical persons should be published in this journal.

The printed issues of the Government Gazette are sold by the National Printing House of Greece. They can also be searched and downloaded from the official site of the House. An issue of the gazette is called "Government Gazette Issue" (ΦΕΚ, FEK), Each issue is separated into volumes called «Τεύχος» with distinct roles.

References

Publications established in 1833
Newspapers published in Greece
Government of Greece
Publishing companies of Greece
Law of Greece
Statutory law
Greece